Carbohydrate sulfotransferase 2 is an enzyme that in humans is encoded by the CHST2 gene.

References

External links

Further reading